Dalhousie Springs, also known as Witjira-Dalhousie Springs, is a group of over 60 natural artesian springs located in Witjira National Park on the western fringe of the Simpson Desert, 180 kilometres northeast of Oodnadatta in northern South Australia.

History
The springs form part of Aboriginal tradition and life in northern South Australia, being a place associated with many Dreamtime stories and songs. Evidence of large camp sites are found at the Springs, some of which are thousands of square metres in size, and there are many stone artefacts found scattered around the area. 

The springs were given their English name by surveyor Richard Randall Knuckey around 1870, when he was working on the Overland Telegraph Line.

In 1915, the total flow rate of the Dalhousie Springs complex was over /second, but drilling had reduced this to /second by 2000.

Witjira-Dalhousie Springs was added to the Australian National Heritage List in August 2009.  In 1980, It was listed on the now-defunct Register of the National Estate.

On 26 November 2021, the government changed the conditions of the park, to forever exclude mining in the Dalhousie Springs National Heritage Area.

Description
Its water comes from part of the Great Artesian Basin aquifer. The Springs complex appears to be recharged by water thousands of years old, percolated down through the beds of Finke and nearby arid zone rivers, which overlie parts of the Great Artesian Basin. As a geological feature, it is unique in Australia.

The water temperatures in the springs range from 38 to 43 degrees Celsius. The water is highly mineralised but just drinkable. There are a number of unique species of fish that live in the waters around Dalhousie Springs, such as the Dalhousie catfish (Neosilurus gloveri), the Dalhousie hardyhead (Craterocephalus dalhousiensis) and the Dalhousie goby (Chlamydogobius gloveri).

Dalhousie Springs is a popular starting point for crossing the Simpson Desert eastwards to Birdsville in Queensland (around ).

References

External links

 Heritage Listing: Dalhousie Springs 
 Official Website
 Listing on the now-defunct Register of the National Estate
 "Dalhousie Springs", Across Australia Motorbike Tour

Springs of Australia
Australian National Heritage List
Far North (South Australia)
South Australian places listed on the defunct Register of the National Estate
Oases